Saint-Étienne-des-Grès is a parish municipality in the Mauricie region of the province of Quebec in Canada.

Local points of interest include La Gabelle Generating Station, a power plant completed in 1924.

Demographics 

Government 
The mayor is the municipality's highest elected official. Saint-Étienne-des-Grès has had thirty-one mayors.

Officially, municipal elections in Saint-Étienne-des-Grès are on a non-partisan basis.

See also 
 La Gabelle Generating Station

References

External links

Parish municipalities in Quebec
Incorporated places in Mauricie